The enzyme mannitol-1-phosphatase (EC 3.1.3.22) catalyzes the reaction

D-mannitol 1-phosphate + H2O  D-mannitol + phosphate

This enzyme belongs to the family of hydrolases, specifically those acting on phosphoric monoester bonds.  The systematic name is D-mannitol-1-phosphate phosphohydrolase. This enzyme is also called mannitol-1-phosphate phosphatase.  This enzyme participates in fructose and mannose metabolism.

References

 
 

EC 3.1.3
Enzymes of unknown structure